The Tuirial is a river of Mizoram and Assam, northeastern India. It is also known as River Sonai, a tributary of Barak River. It flows in a northerly direction towards Cachar district and joins the Barak River at Dungripar Village near Sonai town. It is impounded by the Tuirial Dam.

Geography
It originates from Chawilung hills (62 km from Aizawl) in Aizawl District. It flows northward to join the Barak River in Assam.

References

Rivers of Mizoram
Rivers of India